Like a Pot of Strawberries (French: Comme un pot de fraises) is a 1974 French comedy film by Jean Aurel.

Starring
 Jean-Claude Brialy (Norbert)
 Nathalie Courval (Joëlle)
 Marcha Grant (Olivia)
 Marianne Eggerickx (Amandine)
 Jean Lefebvre (Adrien)
 Bernard Menez (Philippe)
 Bernard Le Coq (Marc)
 Marco Perrin (Fourmelon)
 Pierre Fuger (Bitza)
 Evelyne Ker (la secrétaire de Fourmelon)
 Hubert de Lapparent (le chef de la publicité)
 Marc Dudicourt (le clochard)
 Bernard Musson (le chef du marketing)
 Jean-Pierre Rambal (le chef de la promotion)
 Robert Dalban (le chef des ventes)
 Rosine Young (une prostituée)
 Paul Bisciglia
 Denise Dax
 José Luccioni
 Bernard Dumaine
 Lydia Feld
 Reni Goliard
 Pia Kazan
 Barbara Laurent
 Guy Michel

External links

Comme un pot de fraises at www.filmsdefrance.com

French comedy films
1974 films
Films directed by Jean Aurel
1974 comedy films
1970s French films